David Theander (19 March 1892 – 18 July 1985) was a Swedish swimmer. He competed in the men's 400 metre freestyle event at the 1912 Summer Olympics.

References

External links
 

1892 births
1985 deaths
Olympic swimmers of Sweden
Swimmers at the 1912 Summer Olympics
Swimmers from Stockholm
Swedish male freestyle swimmers